The following ships of the Indian Navy have been named INS Kesari:

  is a  amphibious warfare vessel, currently in active service

Indian Navy ship names